Il Trionfo Di Dori is a collection of 29 Italian madrigals published by Angelo Gardano in Venice in 1592. An edition and commentary was published by Edward Harrison Powley in 1974.
In England the collection was imitated in The Triumphs of Oriana. In German the collection was edited as Musicalische Streitkrantzelein.

Contents
Ove tra l'herbe e i fiori Giovanni Croce. All'apparir di Dori Orazio Colombani. Hor ch'ogni vento tace Orazio Vecchi. Se cantano gli augelli Giovanni Gabrieli. Ninfe a danzar venite Alfonso Preti. Leggiadre ninfe e pastorelli amanti Luca Marenzio. Vaghe ninfe selvagge Giovanni de Macque. Un giorno a Pale sacro Ippolito Baccusi. Giunta qui Dori Giovanni Cavaccio. Nel tempo che ritorna Zefiro Annibale Stabile. All'ombra d'un bel faggio Paolo Bozzi. Su le fiorite sponde Tiburtio Massaino. Asola In una verde piaggia Giovanni Matteo. Smeraldi eran le rive Giulio Eremita. Lungo le chiare linfe Philippe de Monte. Dove sorge piacevole Ippolito Sabino. Quando lieta vezzosa Pietro Andrea Bonini. Eran ninfe e pastori Alessandro Striggio. Piu trasparente velo Giovanni Florio. Di pastorali accenti Leone Leoni. Sotto l'ombroso speco Felice Anerio. L'inargentato lido Gasparo Zerto. Quand'apparisti o vag'o amata Dori Ruggero Giovannelli. Mentr'a quest ombr'I ntorno Gasparo Costa. Dori a quest'ombre e l'aura Lelio Bertani. Mentre pastori e ninfe Lodovico Balbi. Al mormorar de liquidi cristalli Giovanni Giacomo Gastoldi. Da lo spuntar de matutini albori Costanzo Porta. Quando dal terzo cielo Giovanni Pierluigi da Palestrina.

Recordings
Il Trionfo Di Dori - Gruppo Vocale Arsi & Tesi, dir Tony Corradini, Tactus: TC 590003 2014
Il Trionfo Di Dori - The King's Singers, Signum Classics: SIGCD414 2015

References

Madrigals